KONR-LP (106.1 FM, "KONR-LP 106.1FM") is a radio station licensed to serve the community of Anchorage, Alaska. The station is owned by Organization for Northern Development d/b/a Out North and airs a variety format.

The station was assigned the KONR-LP call letters by the Federal Communications Commission on August 10, 2009.

References

External links
 Official Website
 FCC Public Inspection File for KONR-LP
 

ONR-LP
ONR-LP
Radio stations established in 2009
2009 establishments in Alaska
Variety radio stations in the United States
Anchorage, Alaska